Michel Moors (October 28, 1894 - August 16, 1944) was a member of the Belgian Resistance in WWII. He was killed by collaborators, and his son Fernand Moors died in the Dora-Nordhausen concentration camp. A monument to them both stands on Maastrichterstraat, 3740 Mopertingen in Limburg, Belgium.

See also

 National Museum of the Resistance in Anderlecht, Belgium
 Belgium in World War II
 Free Belgian Forces
 Österreichische Freiheitsfront

References

External links